Selenochilus oculator is a species of beetle in the family Carabidae, endemic to New Zealand, known only from the holotype, reportedly collected at Hunua Range, Auckland.

References

Psydrinae
Beetles described in 1893